Wild and Woolfy is a 1945 animated cartoon short, one of six cartoons in which Droopy was paired with a wolf as his acting partner. It is one of a very few cartoons in the series where Bill Thompson did not voice Droopy, instead Tex Avery himself provided the voice.

Plot
In this western-themed cartoon, the Big Bad Wolf, now playing a cowboy criminal called "Joe" Wolf in this cartoon, kidnaps the cowgirl singer, Red (played by Red Hot from Red Hot Riding Hood) from Rig-R-Mortis saloon, where their motto is "Come in and get stiff." Droopy and a posse of cowboys doggedly follow him all over the Great Plains (mainly Droopy), but the wolf is far ahead. However, like in the previous cartoons, Droopy shows up in the places the wolf doesn't expect, forcing him to call for the waiter to keep Droopy away from him.

Finally, in his hideout, the wolf, thinking Red is underneath a sheet, unveils it, and kisses Droopy, who happens to be underneath and sitting on a stack of books. Desperate, the wolf asks him just who the heck he is and why he kept following him throughout the cartoon. Droopy replies, "Why, haven't you heard? I'm the hero," and promptly knocks out the wolf. He calls for the waiter to take the wolf off to jail. After receiving a "My Hero" kiss from Red, Droopy goes crazy and kidnaps Red himself.

Voice cast
Tex Avery as Droopy, Joe Wolf (some lines), Horse
Patrick McGeehan as Joe Wolf, Bar Patrons
Frank Graham as Race Caller
Pinto Colvig as Joe Wolf (howling; reused from Red Hot Riding Hood)
Sara Berner and Ann Pickard as Red

Notes
 Wild and Woolfy is basically a color remake of the 1935 Oswald the Lucky Rabbit cartoon Towne Hall Follies, also directed by Avery (albeit just credited in the other cartoon as a "lead animator") and it featured an identical storyline, despite being set in a different historical context.

References

External links

1945 films
1945 animated films
1945 short films
1940s American animated films
1940s animated short films
1940s Western (genre) comedy films
Droopy
Films directed by Tex Avery
Metro-Goldwyn-Mayer animated short films
Films scored by Scott Bradley
Tex Avery's Big Bad Wolf films
1945 comedy films
Films with screenplays by Henry Wilson Allen
Films produced by Fred Quimby
Metro-Goldwyn-Mayer cartoon studio short films
Red (animated character) films